Yang Dong-hyen is a South Korean football player, who plays for K League 1 club Suwon FC.

Career
In the AFC U-17 Championship in 2002, he scored three goals. He scored in the semifinals against Uzbekistan U-17. And another goal was scored in the finals against Yemen U-17.

In the 2003 FIFA U-17 World Championship, he scored two goals in the group stage. He scored against Spain U-17, and the other against Sierra Leone U-17.

On June 3, 2009, he made his debut match at senior level game against Oman.

After completing his military service with K League 2 side Korean Police FC, Yang returned to his parent club Busan IPark in October 2013.

On 2 January 2020, Seongnam acquired Yang from J2 club Avispa Fukuoka.

Club statistics
Updated to 22 October 2022.

References

External links
 
 National Team Player Record 
 
 

1986 births
Living people
Association football forwards
South Korean footballers
South Korea international footballers
Ulsan Hyundai FC players
Busan IPark players
Pohang Steelers players
Cerezo Osaka players
Avispa Fukuoka players
Ansan Mugunghwa FC players
Seongnam FC players
K League 1 players
K League 2 players
J1 League players
J2 League players
Sportspeople from South Jeolla Province